Varlet can refer to:

Valet
Knight's squire
Valet de chambre, a court appointment introduced in the late Middle Ages
Rogue (vagrant) or unprincipled person

Surname
Dominique Marie Varlet (1678–1742), Roman Catholic bishop during the church's Post Reformation Netherlands period 
Jean-François Varlet (1764–1837), leader of the Enragé faction in the French Revolution
Charles Varlet (1635–1692), real name of La Grange (actor), member of the troupe of Molière
Antoine Varlet (1893–1940), Belgian architect

See also
Knave (disambiguation)